Małgorzata Teresa Ostrowska, née Kuźniewska (born 31 July 1958) is a Polish political figure who served as a member of the Sejm of Poland from 19 September 1993 to 4 November 2007.

A native of the northern town of Malbork, the seat of Malbork County in the Pomeranian Voivodeship, Małgorzata Ostrowska belongs to the Democratic Left Alliance and initially gained her Senate seat in the 1993 parliamentary election.  She was a member of Sejm 1993–1997, Sejm 1997–2001, and Sejm 2001–2005. In the election held on 25 September 2005, she ran in the Gdańsk electoral district, receiving 12,861 votes, but two years later, enmeshed in a corruption investigation, she lost her parliamentary immunity and then her seat in the 2007 parliamentary election.

See also
Members of Polish Sejm 2005-2007

External links
Małgorzata Ostrowska at the Sejm website (includes official photograph, personal interests, voting record and transcripts of speeches)

1958 births
Living people
People from Malbork
Democratic Left Alliance politicians
Members of the Polish Sejm 1993–1997
Members of the Polish Sejm 1997–2001
Members of the Polish Sejm 2001–2005
Members of the Polish Sejm 2005–2007
Women members of the Sejm of the Republic of Poland
20th-century Polish women politicians
21st-century Polish women politicians